Hengconarius is a genus of funnel weavers first described by Zhao & S. Q. Li in 2018.

Species
 it contains eight species:
Hengconarius dedaensis Zhao & S. Q. Li, 2018 — China
Hengconarius exilis (Zhang, Zhu & Wang, 2005) — China
Hengconarius falcatus (Xu & Li, 2006) — China
Hengconarius incertus (Wang, 2003) — China
Hengconarius latusincertus (Wang, Griswold & Miller, 2010) — China
Hengconarius longipalpus Zhao & S. Q. Li, 2018 — China
Hengconarius longpuensis Zhao & S. Q. Li, 2018 — China
Hengconarius pseudobrunneus (Wang, 2003) — China

References

External links

Agelenidae
Araneomorphae genera